Gopalganj Sporting Club is a Bangladeshi team club based in Gopalganj. It competes in the Bangladesh Championship League, the second tier of Bangladesh football.

History

Players
Gopalganj Sporting Club squad for 2022–23 season.

Head coaches' record

Personnel

Current technical staff

References

Football clubs in Bangladesh
2021 establishments in Bangladesh
Sport in Bangladesh
Dhaka